The Vubwi District is a district of Zambia, located in the Eastern Province. It was separated from Chadiza District in 2012.

References

Districts of Eastern Province, Zambia